Greeley Township is a township in Shelby County, Iowa. There are 229 people and 6.4 people per square mile in Greeley Township. The total area is 35.7 square miles.

References

Townships in Shelby County, Iowa
Townships in Iowa